The 2014 Hong Kong Sevens was the 39th edition of the Hong Kong Sevens and the seventh tournament of the 2013–2014 Sevens World Series. It took place at its long-time home, Hong Kong Stadium.

The Cup title was claimed by New Zealand, with South Africa, Scotland and Kenya respectively claiming the lower-level Plate, Bowl and Shield. Japan won the World Series Core Team Qualifier to earn promotion to "core" status for the 2014–15 series.

Format
The teams were drawn into four pools of four teams each. Each team played all others in their pool once. The top two teams from each pool advanced to the Cup/Plate brackets. The bottom two teams from each group entered the Bowl/Shield brackets.

Teams
28 teams were scheduled to participate—16 in the main draw, and 12 in the Core Team Qualifier.

Main draw

World Series core team qualifier

Main draw
The draw was made on 23 March.

Pool stage

Pool A

Pool B

Pool C

Pool D

Knockout stage

Shield

Bowl

Plate

Cup

World Series Qualifier
The draw was made on 23 March.

Pool stage

Pool E

Pool F

Pool G

Ranking matches

References

External links

2014
rugby union
2013–14 IRB Sevens World Series
2014 in Asian rugby union
March 2014 sports events in China